Pandora's Boy is a historical novel by British writer Lindsey Davis, the sixth in her Flavia Albia series. It was published by Hodder & Stoughton in the UK on 5 April 2018, and in the United States in 2018 by St. Martin's Press.

The tale involves the death of a young girl and during her investigation Albia "has to contend with the occult, organised crime, an unusual fertility symbol, and celebrity dining"; the Pandora of the title is a local witch.

The story begins in October AD 89 and is set in Rome, on the Quirinal Hill.

The cover of the UK hardback 1st edition shows a cracked blue glass bird credited as "vessel shaped like bird" from the Corning Museum of Glass

References

Novels set in ancient Rome
British historical novels
Flavia Albia novels
2018 British novels
21st-century British novels

Hodder & Stoughton books
Novels set in the 1st century